Rani Patel in Full Effect is a young adult, historical fiction novel by Sonia Patel, published October 11, 2016 by Cinco Puntos Press.

Plot 
Rani Patel in Full Effect takes place in 1991 on the Hawaiian island of Moloka’i. The novel follows Rani Patel, a Gujarati Indian teenager whose father has sexually abused her. Rani has kept the abuse a secret and at age 16, struggles with her identity and sexuality.  After performing for an underground rap group, she begins to find herself as MC Sutra and becomes the island's first woman rapper. Meanwhile, Rani reveals her secret and begins to heal from her father's abuse.

Reception 
Rani Patel in Full Effect was generally well-received by critics, including starred reviews from Booklist, Kirkus Reviews, Publishers Weekly, and School Library Journal.

Reviewers highlighted Rani's personality, saying it, too, was in “in full effect.” Booklist said, "Rani’s voice ... will resonate with many, even those with little to no familiarity with Rani’s background." Kirkus added, "A powerfully particular, 100 percent genuine character commands this gutsy debut."

Reviewers also noted that Rani's recovery is "unrealistically speedy and conclusive," which Patel, who is a psychiatrist, acknowledges in a concluding note. Despite this, Patel hopes the story "can stand as a model for victims." Given this, Publishers Weekly noted, "Patel compassionately portrays Rani’s entangled emotions, lack of self-confidence, and burgeoning sense of empowerment as she moves forward from trauma."

Awards and honors 
Rani Patel in Full Effect was included in many "best of" and "must read" lists, including the following:

BookExpo America Editor's Buzz Selection of 2016 
 Kirkus Reviews Best Teen Books of 2016 
 New York Public Library 50 Best Teen Books of 2016  
 BookPage Top 10 Best Teen Book of 2016 
 Multnomah County Library Best Books of 2016
 Volumes Bookcafe Staff's Best 20 of 2016 
 Bustle's 15 Essential Novels Of The #MeToo Movement
 Texas Library Association Top 10 Teen Books of 2017

References

External links 
 YA for Changing Times
2016 American novels
American historical novels
Novels set in Hawaii
Novels about Indian women
Novels set in the 1990s
Cinco Puntos Press books